A miscellaneous school is a classification of schools under the education laws of Japan and South Korea.

Japan

Overview
Types of schools classified as miscellaneous schools include driving schools, vocational schools, and some international schools (such as the  run by North Korea-aligned Chongryon). Due to this status they receive a smaller government subsidy than do ordinary Japanese private schools. Their graduates may also face difficulties registering to take entrance examinations for high schools and universities. For example, the Osaka Chinese School warns parents of prospective students that, while the municipal government of Osaka allows OCS graduates who are Chinese citizens and people of Chinese descent to sit for public high school examinations, the government has refused the same permission to OCS graduates who are Japanese citizens not of Chinese descent.

Standards of recognition

Regulations setting out the standards for accreditation as a miscellaneous school were issued by the then-Ministry of Education in 1956. Under those regulations, the power to accredit miscellaneous schools was assigned to the prefectural governors. The accreditation standards thus differ by prefecture. For example, as of 2011, the minimum threshold for total assets as a proportion of yearly operational expense ranged from one-sixth to two-thirds, and some prefectures demand that miscellaneous schools own lands and buildings as a condition of accreditation, while others have relaxed this standard and allow schools which rent their facilities on a long-term or even short-term basis.

Some international schools have been able to convert from "miscellaneous school" to so-called "Article 1 school" status, making them ordinary recognised private schools under Japanese law.  have been unable to obtain this kind of official recognition as private schools, a situation which their supporters have described as discriminatory.

South Korea
Article 12 of the regulations defines schools for foreigners following the curricula of a foreign country as one type of gakjong hakkyo.

References 

School types
Education in Japan
Education in South Korea